Now Kola may refer to:
 Now Kola, Amol
 Now Kola, Qaem Shahr